Gylfason is a surname of Icelandic origin, meaning son of Gylfi. In Icelandic names, the name is not strictly a surname, but a patronymic. The name refers to:

Ágúst Gylfason (born 1971), Icelandic footballer
Vilmundur Gylfason (1948–1983), Icelandic politician, historian, and poet
Þorsteinn Gylfason (1942–2005), Icelandic philosopher, poet, and translator
Þorvaldur Gylfason, Icelandic economist and professor of economics

Icelandic-language surnames